The women's 100m T46 event at the 2008 Summer Paralympics took place at the Beijing National Stadium on 10 September. There were two heats; the first 3 in each heat (Q) plus the 2 fastest other times (q) qualified.

Results

Heats
Competed from 11:10.

Heat 1

Heat 2

Final
Competed at 18:00.

Q = qualified for final by place. q = qualified by time. WR = World Record. DNS = Did not start.

References
 
 

W
2008 in women's athletics